Jack Edward Larson (February 8, 1928 – September 20, 2015) was an American actor, librettist, screenwriter and producer best known for his portrayal of photographer/cub reporter Jimmy Olsen on the television series Adventures of Superman.

Life and career
Larson was born on February 8, 1928 in Los Angeles, the son of Anita (Calicoff), a Western Union clerk, and George Larson, a milk truck driver. His father was of English and Swedish descent and his mother was from a Jewish family (from Germany and Russia). He was raised in Pasadena. He graduated from Montebello High School in 1945, aged 17 and at times claimed 1933 as his birth year.

Larson found the role of cub reporter Jimmy Olsen on The Adventures of Superman to be a handicap, because he became typecast as a naive young man. This caused him to do little acting after the show ended in 1958, and he turned to writing and production, with an output that included plays, a libretto, texts for classical music, and movies such as The Baby Maker. In later years his attitude towards the Jimmy Olsen role warmed, as he focused more on the love people had for the character. Larson was always willing to sit for interviews about the Superman series and his connection to it, and began having a number of cameos that paid subtle tribute to his character and the series, including a 1991 episode of the TV series Superboy, alongside Noel Neill, who played Lois Lane in Adventures of Superman, and an episode of Lois & Clark: The New Adventures of Superman as an aged Jimmy Olsen in the episode "Brutal Youth", first broadcast on October 20, 1996.

Larson had a cameo in a late-1990s American Express card commercial, The Adventures of Seinfeld & Superman. He and Neill provided commentary on several Adventures of Superman episodes for the January 2006 DVD release of the 1953 season, and in 2006, he appeared in Bryan Singer's film Superman Returns in a cameo role as "Bo the Bartender". Bo wore a bowtie, a trademark of Larson's depiction of Jimmy Olsen. Larson and Neill appeared together at the premiere of Superman Returns.

Larson's last television appearance was in the Law & Order: Special Victims Unit episode "Quickie", which aired on the NBC network on January 6, 2010.

Larson was interviewed extensively for the movie Making Montgomery Clift in which he verified Clift's nephew's (Rob Clift, Director) claim that Clift was not a dark tragically depressed figure, but someone who loved life and the people who loved him in return.

Among his other work, Larson wrote the libretto to the opera Lord Byron to music by Virgil Thomson.

Personal life
Larson was the life partner of director James Bridges from 1958 until Bridges' death on June 6, 1993. Prior to that, he was the companion of actor Montgomery Clift.

Larson owned and resided in the Frank Lloyd Wright–designed George Sturges House in the Brentwood section of Los Angeles, California, until his death.

He died on September 20, 2015, at the age of 87. His interment was at Rose Hills Memorial Park in Whittier, California.

Filmography

Film
1948: Fighter Squadron – Lt. 'Shorty' Kirk
1949: Flame of Youth – Boy (uncredited)
1950: Redwood Forest Trail – Tommy (uncredited)
1950: Trial Without Jury – Dusty (uncredited)
1951: A Wonderful Life (short) – Richard Wood (age 16)
1951: Fighting Coast Guard – Newsboy (uncredited)
1951: On the Loose – Charleston Bit (uncredited)
1951: Starlift – Will (uncredited)
1952: Kid Monk Baroni – Angelo
1952: Belles on Their Toes – Packy Talbot (uncredited)
1952: Battle Zone – Cpl. James O'Doole
1952: Flat Top – "Scuttlebutt" Sailor
1953: Star of Texas – Henchman John Jenkins
1953: Three Sailors and a Girl – Sailor (uncredited)
1953: Man Crazy – Bob
1954: Stamp Day for Superman (Short) – Jimmy Olsen
1954: About Mrs. Leslie – Buddy Boyd
1957: Johnny Trouble – Eddie Landis
1981: ‘’Superman the Movie-Director’s Cut’’ - Passenger on train
2019: ‘’Making Montgomery Clift’’ - Himself
2006: Superman Returns – Bo the Bartender
2009: Bob's New Suit – Edward McIntyre
2016: Surge of Power: Revenge of the Sequel – Uncle Jimmy Williamson (Released posthumously, final film role)

Television
1952-1958: Adventures of Superman – Jimmy Olsen / Collins
1955: Navy Log – Gordon / Freddie / John Crawford / Herbie
1960: The Millionaire – Buzz
1965: Gomer Pyle, U.S.M.C. – Tommy
1991: Superboy – Lou Lamont
1996: Lois & Clark: The New Adventures of Superman – Old Jimmy Olsen
2002: Teamo Supremo - B. Barry Beryllium 
2010: Law & Order: Special Victims Unit – Dewey Butler

References

External links

Superman fan site
 

American male film actors
American male television actors
American gay actors
Male actors from Los Angeles
Male actors from Pasadena, California
American people of Swedish-Jewish descent
American people of Russian descent
American opera librettists
Inkpot Award winners
American male screenwriters
20th-century American male actors
21st-century American male actors
20th-century American writers
Writers from Los Angeles
1928 births
2015 deaths
LGBT people from California
People from Brentwood, Los Angeles
Burials at Rose Hills Memorial Park
20th-century American male writers
Screenwriters from California
People from Montebello, California